Desire Wire is the debut album by singer-songwriter and musician Cindy Bullens, released in 1978 on United Artists Records. It was produced by Tony Bongiovi and Lance Quinn. 
AllMusic's William Ruhlmann calls it "one of the great lost rock albums of the '70s".

This album features the track, "Survivor", which peaked at number 56 on the Billboard Hot 100 pop singles chart in February 1979.

Track listing

All songs written by Cindy Bullens except where noted.

Side one
 "Survivor" — 4:28
 "Anxious Heart" (Cindy Bullens, Trevor Veitch) — 2:58
 "Desire Wire" — 4:23
 "Time ‘N Charges" (Cindy Bullens, Billy Mernit) — 2:50
 "High School History" — 4:15

Side two
 "Mean In Your Heart" – 4:58
 "Hot Tears" – 3:27
 "Knee Deep In Love" – 5:57
 "Finally Rockin’" – 3:26

Personnel
Cindy Bullens - acoustic guitar, electric guitar, lead vocals 
Bob Babbitt, Neil Jason - bass
Allan Schwartzberg, Jerry Marotta - drums
Danny Gatton, David Mansfield, Jeff Mironov, Lance Quinn, Mark Doyle - electric guitar
George Young (tracks: A5), Lou Marini (tracks: A4, B4) - horns
Harold Wheeler (tracks: A4, B4), Wildwood Horns (tracks: A5) - horn arrangements
Jerry Peterson (tracks: B1) - horn arrangements, double saxophone
Harold Wheeler - string arrangements
Ken Bichel - synthesizer
Paul Shaffer, Rob Mounsey, Billy Mernit - keyboards
Leon Pendarvis, Jr. - keyboards, synthesizer
Jimmy Maelen - percussion
Cindy Bullens, Jon Joyce, Billy Mernit - backing vocals

References

External links
Desire Wire by Cindy Bullens at Vinyl History
Desire Wire by Cindy Bullens at Rate Your Music
Desire Wire by Cindy Bullens at Sharing Needles blogspot
Desire Wire by Cindy Bullens at Discogs
Desire Wire by Cindy Bullens at Bandcamp
Desire Wire by Cindy Bullens at CD Baby
Desire Wire by Cindy Bullens at MusicBrainz

1978 debut albums
Albums produced by Tony Bongiovi
United Artists Records albums